Piercing I is a 2010 Chinese animated film directed by Liu Jian.

Plot
Due to the financial crisis, many factories in China are forced to close their doors in late 2008.

Zhang Xiaojun loses his job in a shoe factory. One day, a supermarket guard beats him up, thinking Zhang is a thief. In vain, he asks the supermarket manager for financial redress. Zhang's dearest wish is to return to his village and become a farmer. But right before his departure, the police arrest him. The supermarket manager also has his problems. On a moonlit night, the storylines converge in a teahouse near the city rampart.

Reception
It won the Asia Pacific Screen Award for Best Animated Feature Film at the 4th Asia Pacific Screen Awards.

References

External links
 

2010 animated films
2010 films
Animated drama films
Chinese animated films
Best Animated Feature Film Asia Pacific Screen Award winners